Hungary has recognized registered partnerships since 1 July 2009, offering same-sex couples nearly all the rights and benefits of marriage. Unregistered cohabitation for same-sex couples was recognised and placed on equal footing with the unregistered cohabitation of different-sex couples in 1996. However, same-sex marriage is prohibited by the 2011 Constitution of Hungary, which took effect in January 2012.

Unregistered cohabitation
Cohabitation law applies to couples living together in an economic and sexual relationship, including opposite-sex and same-sex couples. No official registration is required. Hungarian law gives some specified rights and benefits to two persons living together. These rights include hospital visitation and access to medical information, jail and prison visitation rights for the partner of an incarcerated person, right to make decisions about the deceased partner's funeral, right to declare a same-sex partner as a next of kin, widow's pension, immigration rights, etc. Some of these benefits require an official statement from the social department of the local government that proves that the partners are indeed cohabiting.

Registered partnerships
In 2007, the Gyurcsány Government, comprising the Alliance of Free Democrats (SZDSZ) and the Hungarian Socialist Party (MSZP), submitted a bill to the National Assembly to establish registered partnerships for both same-sex and opposite-sex couples. Parliament adopted the bill on 17 December 2007. This act would have provided all of the rights of marriage to registered partners except for the ability to adopt and to take a common surname. The registered partnership act would have entered into force on 1 January 2009, but on 15 December 2008 the Hungarian Constitutional Court declared it unconstitutional on the grounds that it duplicated the institution of marriage for opposite-sex couples. The court found that a registered partnership law that only applied to same-sex couples would be constitutional; indeed, it opined that the Parliament had a duty to introduce such a law. Prime Minister Ferenc Gyurcsány instructed the Minister of Justice, Tibor Draskovics, to draft a new, revised bill that would conform to the court's decision.

On 23 December 2008, the government announced that it would introduce a new registered partnership bill in line with the Constitutional Court's decision. The legislation would offer same-sex couples all of the rights offered by the previous act, and would be presented to Parliament as early as February 2009. On 12 February 2009, the government approved the new bill, and it was adopted by the National Assembly on 20 April 2009. 199 MPs (from the governing Socialist and Alliance of Free Democrats parties) voted for the bill, while 159 MPs (mostly from Fidesz and the Christian Democratic People's Party) voted against it, and 8 unallied MPs abstained. The new registered partnership act took effect on 1 July 2009. On 23 March 2010, the Constitutional Court ruled that the law is constitutional.

Registered partnerships are only open to same-sex couples. Registered partners are entitled to the same inheritance and property rights, widow's pension, tax benefits, social benefits, and immigration and naturalization rights as married spouses. Partners are also entitled to receive information about the health of their partner and make medical decisions if the partner cannot do so themselves (e.g. accident), are treated as next-of-kin in criminal law, and are protected from domestic violence. Unlike married spouses, registered partners cannot take a common surname, adopt or participate in artificial insemination.

In February 2018, the Budapest District Court ruled that Hungary must recognize same-sex marriages performed abroad as registered partnerships.

Statistics
The number of registered partnerships established in Hungary per year is shown in the table below.

Same-sex marriage

In September 2007, the liberal Alliance of Free Democrats, part of the governing coalition since the 2002 elections, presented a draft same-sex marriage bill to the Parliament's Human Rights Committee. This would have defined marriage as the union of "two persons" over the age of 18 irrespective of gender. On 6 November 2007, the committee rejected the bill without debate. Opponents of the bill pointed to a Constitutional Court ruling a few months earlier that defined the institution of marriage as a bond "between a man and a woman".

On 1 January 2012, a new constitution enacted by the government of Viktor Orbán, leader of the ruling Fidesz party, came into effect, restricting marriage to opposite-sex couples and containing no guarantees of protection from discrimination on account of sexual orientation. Article L reads: "Hungary shall protect the institution of marriage as the union of a man and a woman established by voluntary decision, and the family as the basis of the nation's survival."

On 29 June 2015, Deputy Gábor Fodor from the Liberal Party introduced a constitutional amendment to define marriage as a union of two people and a bill to make appropriate changes in statutory laws. Both measures were rejected by the Parliament's Justice Committee on 26 October 2015.

Public opinion
Several opinion polls have been conducted to gauge the attitudes of Hungarians on the issue of same-sex marriage and registered partnerships. A Eurobarometer survey released in December 2006 found that 18% of Hungarians believed same-sex marriages should be allowed throughout Europe. A poll conducted by Medián  in July 2007 showed that 30% of respondents considered it "acceptable" for same-sex couples to get married, and a poll by MASMI (Market Research & Public Opinion Polling) published in December 2007 showed that 35% of Hungarians were in favour of allowing same-sex couples to marry.

A poll by Szonda Ipsos in September 2009 found that the majority of Hungarians, 58%, supported the newly introduced registered partnership law for same-sex couples.

A May 2013 Ipsos poll found that 30% of respondents were in favour of same-sex marriage and another 21% supported other forms of recognition for same-sex couples.

The 2015 Eurobarometer found that 39% of Hungarians thought same-sex marriage should be allowed throughout Europe, while 53% were opposed.

A 2016 opinion poll conducted by Budapest Pride and Integrity Lab found that 36% of Hungarians were in favour of same-sex marriage, while 56% were opposed and 7% were undecided (21% "strongly" supported, 15% "somewhat" supported, 15% "somewhat" opposed and 41% "strongly" opposed). The poll also found that 60% of the population agreed that lesbian, gay and bisexual people should have the same rights as heterosexual people, and 46% supported adoption rights for same-sex couples with 47% opposed. Support for same-sex marriage was higher among women (40%) than among men (33%), higher among university graduates (43%), and higher among people who personally knew a gay person (46%). Opposition was mainly concentrated among religious people, with 75% of regular church attendees opposing same-sex marriage, decreasing based on the level of church attendance, and among voters of the ruling Fidesz party (71%). Among irreligious people, support and opposition both stood at 47%. Despite a majority of Hungarians opposing same-sex marriage, the poll found that 60% disagreed with the belief that same-sex marriage poses a threat to Hungarian values and 66% were of the opinion that "same-sex couples want to get married as a show of their mutual love and devotion".

A poll by Pew Research Center published in May 2017 found that 27% of Hungarians were in favor of same-sex marriage, while 64% opposed it. Support was higher among non-religious people (34%) and 18–34 year olds (39%), in contrast to Catholics (25%) and people aged 35 and over (23%).

The 2019 Eurobarometer found that 33% of Hungarians thought same-sex marriage should be allowed throughout Europe, while 61% were opposed.

A May 2021 Ipsos poll showed that 46% of Hungarians supported same-sex marriage, 20% supported partnerships but not marriage, while 18% were opposed to all legal recognition for same-sex couples, and 17% were undecided.

See also 
 LGBT rights in Hungary
 Recognition of same-sex unions in Europe

Notes

References

External links 
 

LGBT rights in Hungary
Hungary